Gastón Andrés Lodico (born 28 May 1998) is an Argentine professional footballer who plays as a midfielder for O'Higgins on loan from Lanús.

Career
Lodico joined Lanús in 2008 from Racing Club. Originally he was with Lanús' U20s, representing them at the 2016 U-20 Copa Libertadores before moving into the senior squad in 2018. His professional debut arrived on 27 January against Patronato, he was selected for the full duration of a 1–1 home draw in the Argentine Primera División. In his eleventh appearance, Lodico scored his first goal during a league fixture away to San Martín. Overall, Lodico made sixteen appearances in his debut season of 2017–18.

Loan spells

Ferencváros
Lodico had a seven-month loan spell in Hungary with Ferencváros in 2020, winning the 2019–20 title.

On 16 June 2020, he became champion with Ferencváros by beating Budapest Honvéd FC at the Hidegkuti Nándor Stadion on the 30th match day of the 2019–20 Nemzeti Bajnokság I season.

Aldosivi
On 27 January 2022, Lodico joined Aldosivi on a one-year loan. He made a 30 appearances and scored four goals, during the year.

O'Higgins
On 15 February 2022, Lodico was once again loaned out, this time på Chilean club O'Higgins until the end of 2022.

Personal life
Lodico is the nephew of former professional footballers Carlos Lodico and José Lodico.

Career statistics
.

Honours
Ferencváros
Nemzeti Bajnokság I: 2019–20

References

External links

1998 births
Living people
Sportspeople from Avellaneda
Argentine people of Italian descent
Argentine footballers
Association football midfielders
Argentine expatriate footballers
Club Atlético Lanús footballers
Ferencvárosi TC footballers
Aldosivi footballers
O'Higgins F.C. footballers
Argentine Primera División players
Nemzeti Bajnokság I players
Chilean Primera División players
Argentine expatriate sportspeople in Hungary
Argentine expatriate sportspeople in Chile
Expatriate footballers in Hungary
Expatriate footballers in Chile